Actin-related protein 2/3 complex subunit 3 is a protein that in humans is encoded by the ARPC3 gene.

This gene encodes one of seven subunits of the Arp2/3 protein complex. The Arp2/3 protein complex has been implicated in the control of actin polymerization in cells and has been conserved through evolution. The exact role of the protein encoded by this gene, the p21 subunit, has yet to be determined.

References

Further reading

External links